The Pearl Harbor Memorial Bridge is the name of several bridges in the United States:

Pearl Harbor Memorial Bridge (Connecticut), over the Quinnipiac River
Pearl Harbor Remembrance Bridge (Maine), over the Kennebec River, sometimes referred to as the Memorial Bridge
Pearl Harbor Memorial Bridge (Maryland), over the Severn River
Pearl Harbor Memorial Bridge (Pennsylvania), over the Schuylkill River

See also
Pearl Harbor Memorial Highway, several roads
Delaware Memorial Bridge